The Kansas Highway Patrol (KHP) is the highway patrol agency for the U.S. state of Kansas. While the patrol's primary focus is maintaining the safety of State, Federal and Interstate highways, it also is charged with providing support for rural and small municipal police departments when tactical, aerial or other specialized services are needed. The Kansas Highway Patrol has statewide jurisdiction, and frequently assists other agencies with emergency calls for service ranging from accidents to fights in progress.

History
In 1933, the Kansas Legislature, Governor Alfred Landon, and Highway Department Attorney Wint Smith acted to halt the rampant bank robberies and crime sprees of the 1920s and 1930s. They created a force of ten Motor Vehicle Inspectors, forerunners of Kansas Troopers, under the control of the State Highway Commission.

The Legislature officially organized the Kansas Highway Patrol in 1937. A superintendent, assistant superintendent, and 45 troopers were hired to reduce crashes by enforcing traffic, vehicle, and license laws. Kansas City Police Department veteran Jack B. Jenkins was the first superintendent.

The Governor appointed a Superintendent, and the Superintendent appointed the remainder of the Patrol. All appointees had to pass a physical exam and be U.S. citizens, at least 24 years old, of good health and moral character, and without a criminal record. The 1941 Kansas Civil Service Law affected appointment procedures, but as late as 1945, half the appointees had to belong to the governor's political party, and the other half had to be members of the political party that garnered the second highest number of votes in the gubernatorial election.

In the 1950s, the patrol was contracted to patrol the Kansas Turnpike Authority, and Protective Services began with one Trooper providing ground transportation for the Governor. The recruit school moved from the State Reformatory in Hutchinson to the University of Kansas (KU) in Lawrence. Increasingly, troopers patrolled alone. Before, they always rode in pairs.

In the 1960s, each trooper was assigned a patrol car to improve roadway coverage, and access to the Law Enforcement Teletype System and National Crime Information Center improved the patrol's communications. The first promotional examinations were given, and the former ready-alert facility of the deactivated Schilling Air Force Base in Salina became the patrol's Training Center. Also, the Motor Vehicle Department began examining license applicants, releasing Trooper-Examiners to law enforcement duties.

In 1976, the KHP gained authority over the Capitol Area Security Patrol, which now commonly referred to as the Kansas Capitol Police, or Troop K. In 1988, the responsibility to enforce motor carrier laws was passed from the Department of Revenue to the patrol. As a result, the Patrol inherited Motor Carrier Inspectors and began operation of Motor Carrier Weigh Stations across the state.

In the 1990s, the KHP had outgrown its training center. The state took over the former Marymount College campus in Salina, to house the training academy, statewide communications center and central region offices.

The first female troopers joined the KHP in 1981. Today, the agency actively recruits women and men to be troopers and to fill other uniformed and civilian positions. Besides Troopers, the agency employs Capitol Police Officers, Capitol Area Guards, Motor Carrier Inspectors, Communications Specialists, Vehicle Identification Number Inspectors, Motorist Assistance Technicians, and civilians in a variety of other support positions.

In 2011, the KHP purchased the last-produced Ford Crown Victoria Police Interceptor for its fleet.

Morale controversy
In 2014, amidst many allegations of abuse of power and inconsistent work practices resulting in overall low morale, the University of Kansas School of Business proctored a thorough survey of all KHP Employees that were willing to participate. The results of the survey revealed that the majority held great loyalty to the agency, but believed upper-level command staff needlessly doled out disciplinary actions to those they personally disliked, showed favoritism during promotional processes, and were generally incompetent when it came to making important decisions regarding the overall direction of the patrol. Colonel Ernest Garcia and Lieutenant Colonel Alan Stoecklein were both mentioned by name multiple times in an open-ended section at the end of the survey where employees could comment freely. Kansas State Troopers Association President Mitch Mellick said that the survey revealed concerns that had long been held by troopers across the state regarding labor practices and benefits. Lieutenant Colonel Stoecklein soon thereafter announced his retirement, effective September 15, 2014 and Colonel Ernest Garcia announced he was leaving the agency on January 5, 2015.

Organization
The Kansas Highway Patrol is under the direction of the superintendent, who holds the rank of colonel. The superintendent is appointed by the Governor of Kansas. The superintendent appoints an assistant superintendent who holds the rank of lieutenant colonel to assist them. Under the assistant superintendent are five executive commanders who hold the rank of major. These officers comprise the executive command staff of the Patrol.

The Patrol is organized into several divisions, and each are overseen by an executive commander. Each division or region is further divided by its geographical area of responsibility (known as a "troop") or its function. Each troop or functional group is overseen by a commander who holds the rank of captain. Administrative groups are overseen by a civilian director. Each troop is further divided into "zones" of one or several counties. Each zone is overseen by a field supervisor who holds the rank of lieutenant.

Rank structure

Pay and pensions
Officers of the Kansas Highway Patrol begin their career as trooper trainees in the training academy at a base hourly rate. Upon graduation, a pay increase occurs, followed by another the beginning of their fourth year. Upon their fifth year, troopers are eligible for promotion to Master or Technical Trooper with an accompanying increase in pay. Additional years of service and experience qualify troopers for promotion to lieutenant (pay grade 36), captain (pay grade 38), and major (pay grade 38).

Troopers' retirement is administered by the Kansas Public Employees Retirement System (KPERS) which provides a defined benefit plan, the Kansas Police and Firemen's Retirement System (KP&F). Contributions are made on a pre-tax basis each pay period, with 7.15% of gross earnings withdrawn automatically. Tier I retirees (those employees who were enrolled in KP&F before July 1, 1989 and did not choose Tier II coverage) and Tier II retirees (all employees hired on or before July 1, 1989 or those who were hired earlier and chose Tier II coverage) may retire and are vested at different times.

In addition to the provided pension, employees are eligible to enroll in the Kansas Public Employees Retirement System (KPERS) 457(b) deferred compensation plan, known as KPERS 457.

Officers of the agency

State Troopers

State troopers are certified law enforcement officers who enforce Kansas laws. Troopers have law enforcement jurisdiction throughout the state. Daily responsibilities include performing traffic stops, providing emergency medical assistance, assisting motorists, investigating crashes, detecting and deterring criminal activity, and assisting other law enforcement agencies. State troopers assist during civil disturbances and natural disasters, provide law enforcement at the Kansas State Fair, inspect school buses and motor vehicles, testify in court, and educate the public about traffic safety.

Capitol Police Officers

The Kansas Capitol Police, as they are known today, are members of a specialty troop of the Kansas Highway Patrol (Troop K). The Capitol Police originally became part of the Kansas Highway Patrol in 1976, under the designation of Kansas Capitol Area Security Patrol, or C.A.S.P.

In the early days of C.A.S.P., the police officers of this special unit were statutorily only allowed to enforce laws on or about state property; leaving them powerless to act on a violation of the law when traveling from one property to another.

In 1995 The Kansas Legislature gave county wide law enforcement jurisdiction to the Capitol Police, and several years thereafter full statewide jurisdiction. With this added jurisdiction and the expanding role of C.A.S.P. legislation was also passed to officially change the name of the unit from C.A.S.P. to the Kansas Capitol Police.

Capitol Police Officers carry the same types of weapons and are issued the same types of equipment and vehicles as Kansas State Troopers. Although they are members of the Kansas Highway Patrol, they are considered “officers” not troopers, and wear slightly different uniforms. Most attended other police academies, not the trooper academy. In 2018, five Capitol Police officers attended the entire trooper academy but still graduated as Capitol police. In 2019, two more attended the trooper academy. Those who attended the full trooper academy are allowed to transfer out of Troop K and become a trooper have a specified amount of time in the Capitol.

Troop K is one of only two Kansas Highway Patrol Troops that provide 24-hour, 7-day-a-week police coverage. This coverage currently entails answering calls for service/patrolling over 100 state properties in Shawnee County Kansas, assisting other law enforcement agencies, investigation traffic accidents, intervening in crimes in progress, and traffic enforcement. The Capitol Police are also charged with providing uniformed police protection at the governor's mansion, the statehouse, the insurance regulation building, and the judicial center.

Motor Carrier Inspectors (Troop I)

Motor carrier inspectors perform thousands of roadside inspections each year, and enforce state laws and federal regulations that promote the safe operation of commercial motor vehicles. MCIs enforce state statutes governing size and weight of vehicles, assist stranded motorists, promote voluntary compliance with the law through educational programs, testify in court, and assist during civil disturbances, natural disasters, and crash scenes. MCIs also train outside agencies in commercial motor vehicle weight and safety regulations. However, most training is conducted by the technical troopers within Troop I (MCSAP troopers).

Motor carrier inspectors work at established scale houses throughout the state, and MCI Law Enforcement Officers conduct mobile inspections. The MCI Law Enforcement Officers are certified law enforcement officers, (but are not troopers), who in addition to inspecting commercial motor vehicles, detect and deter criminal activity, and apprehend criminal offenders.

Around approximately 2015, it was decided the mobile motor carrier inspector position would be eliminated through attrition. The MCIs were allowed to remain employed but had no opportunity for advancement. When they retire, their positions are replaced by technical troopers who perform the MCI duties of size and weight enforcement as well as typical trooper duties.

Communications Specialists (Troop M)

Communications specialists support field personnel 24 hours a day, seven days a week by rapidly and efficiently broadcasting information from the Highway Patrol's Central Communications Center in Salina, Kansas. Daily responsibilities include operating a data entry terminal and radio communication system to send, relay, and receive information. Communications Specialists maintain continuous contact among Highway Patrol personnel and other emergency response agencies, and they disseminate information for officers to apprehend offenders, develop investigative leads, track criminal activity, identify stolen property, and locate missing persons.

Communications specialists also coordinate emergency medical relays across the state using aircraft and ground units, and monitor alarms and warning systems, such as those issued by the National Weather Service and local emergency managers.

Equipment

Previous firearms
The last revolver issued was the Smith & Wesson Model 586 .357 Magnum revolver. In 1991, the SIG Sauer P220 .45 ACP was the first semi-automatic pistol carried by the agency until it was replaced in 1998 by the Glock 21 .45 ACP pistol. In 2009, the agency was one of the first in the United States to adopt the Glock 21SF (Short Frame) series sidearms (the other state agency to adopt the Glock 21SF shortly after would be the Nebraska State Patrol who still uses them). The Glock 21SF was first issued with a standard Level 1 or Level 2 high gloss leather holster, but the agency would later adopt the Safariland 6360 Level 3 holsters in around 2013–2014. In late 2018, the Patrol transitioned to 9mm with the Glock 17 Gen 5 carried in a Safariland 6360 Level 3 holster. The transition to 9mm was based upon Federal Bureau of Investigation testing which demonstrated a marked ballistic improvement upon earlier technology.

Vehicle issuance and retirement

Each trooper is issued their own patrol vehicle. Patrol vehicles are retired before reaching 50,000 miles and are subsequently resold to other governmental agencies at a reduced price.

Fallen officers
Since the establishment of the Kansas Highway Patrol, 10 officers have died in the line of duty.

See also

 List of law enforcement agencies in Kansas
 State police
 Highway patrol
 Kansas Bureau of Investigation

References

External links

Kansas Highway Patrol publications at KGI Online Library

State law enforcement agencies of Kansas
Government agencies established in 1937
1937 establishments in Kansas